The Philippine House Special Committee on Persons with Disabilities is a special committee of the Philippine House of Representatives.

Jurisdiction 
As prescribed by House Rules, the committee's jurisdiction includes the following:
 Needs, rights and welfare of persons with disabilities (PWD)
 Policies and programs that will enhance PWD active participation and integration in society

Members, 18th Congress

See also 
 House of Representatives of the Philippines
 List of Philippine House of Representatives committees

References

External links 
House of Representatives of the Philippines

Persons with Disabilities